Dr. Phillips Center for the Performing Arts (commonly known as Dr. Phillips Center) is a performing arts center in Downtown Orlando, Florida, United States. It joined the Bob Carr Theater, which originally opened as the Orlando Municipal Auditorium in 1927, to become Orlando's main performance venue. The center's grand opening was held on November 6, 2014. 
 
Barton Myers was the design architect with Artec Acoustic Consultants and Theatre Project Consultants co-designing the theaters.  HKS Architects was the executive architect in association with Baker Barrios Architects, Inc.

About

The venue was approved along with a new Amway Center (which replaced the Amway Arena) and improvements to the Camping World Stadium after a series of hearings and votes, culminating in final votes in the Orange County Board of County Commissioners on July 26, 2007, and the Orlando City Council on August 6, 2007.

The design for the new venue was revealed on August 21, 2008. The venue features a 2,700-seat amplified hall, Walt Disney Theater, for Broadway musicals and multi-genre concerts as well as a 300-seat venue, Alexis & Pugh Theater, for smaller shows and events. The third theater, Steinmetz Hall, a 1,700-seat multiform theater achieves an N1 sound rating–the highest possible acoustical rating. The acoustically remarkable Steinmetz Hall can transform into three different theater styles (symphony concert hall, proscenium hall, and banquet hall) to accommodate multiple events and performances. Construction for Steinmetz Hall began on March 6, 2017 and officially opened on January 14, 2022. The final performance space to complete the arts center is Judson's, a dynamic music room with cabaret-style seating to host intimate events and live entertainment. Judson's is slated to open in 2023. 

In response to the COVID-19 pandemic in 2020, the Dr. Phillips Center came up with a concept for an outdoor, socially distanced venue to continue offering performances in a time when so much of the world had shut down. In May of 2020, the idea for creating the Frontyard Festival™, presented by AdventHealth began and officially launched on December 5, 2020 with its first show. Located on the front lawn of the Dr. Phillips Center, the Seneff Arts Plaza, the Frontyard Festival™ offered socially distant boxes that could seat up to six people. Food and drinks were delivered from on-site restaurants while performances and events were put on a stage at the front of the venue. The series was meant to run until June 2020, but was extended another six months and had its final event on December 13, 2021. The Frontyard Festival™ won the Silver Stevie® Award for “Most Valuable Non-Profit Response to COVID-19” from The American Business Awards and the Golden Brick Award for “Innovation” from Downtown Orlando Partnership.

The venue costs US$613 million, with the completion of Steinmetz Hall. Two-thirds of the funding comes from public funds, largely from the Orange County tourist development tax.  The other one-third comes from private donations, including a large grant from the Dr. P. Phillips Foundation, the philanthropic organization funded through the estate of Philip Phillips.

A slow-down in the tourist development tax and other economic conditions forced the plans to become phased into two stages of construction. Walt Disney Theater and Alexis & Jim Pugh Theater were part of Phase I. Phase II included Steinmetz Hall and Judson's. Groundbreaking took place in June 2011.

The center occupies two city blocks. Some of the existing structures demolished to clear room for the center include Orlando Fire Department Station #1 (which moved to Central Blvd.); an annex building of First United Methodist Church of Orlando; and the round American Federal Building, constructed in the 1960s. The center is bordered by Orange Ave. to the west, South St. to the north, Rosalind Ave. to the east, and Anderson St. to the south. Magnolia Ave. bisects the property.

The first Broadway production to play the Walt Disney Theater was Cameron Mackintosh's new, non-replica production of The Phantom of the Opera.

References

Buildings and structures in Orlando, Florida
Music venues in Orlando, Florida
Tourist attractions in Orlando, Florida
Music venues in Florida
Performing arts centers in Florida
Concert halls in Florida
Theatres in Florida
Theatres completed in 2014
Event venues established in 2014
2014 establishments in Florida